Neurospora is a genus of Ascomycete fungi. The genus name, meaning "nerve spore" refers to the characteristic striations on the spores that resemble axons.

The best known species in this genus is Neurospora crassa, a common model organism in biology. Neurospora intermedia var. oncomensis is believed to be the only mold belonging to Neurospora which is used in food production (to make oncom).

Characteristics
Neurospora species are molds with broadly spreading colonies, with abundant production of ascomata. Ascomata are superficial or immersed, perithecial and ostiolate or cleistothecial and non-ostiolate, hairy or glabrous, dark coloured. Peridium membranaceous, asci cylindrical, clavate or subspherical, with a persistent or evanescent wall, usually with a thickened and non-amyloid annular structure at the apex, usually 8-spored. Ascospores broadly fusiform, ellipsoidal, or nearly spherical, unicellular, hyaline to yellowish brown or olive-brown, becoming dark and opaque at maturity, ascospore wall with longitudinal ribs or pitted, occasionally nearly smooth, 1–2 (but rarely up to 12) germ pores disposed at the ends of the ascospores, gelatinous sheaths or appendages are absent. Anamorphs are known in only a relatively small number of species, which belong to the fungi imperfecti genus Chrysonilia. The type species of the genus is Neurospora sitophila Shear

Systematics
The former genus Gelasinospora is closely related and not resolved as a distinct monophyletic group, thus the former genus is nowadays included as a synonym of Neurospora.

Species
Neurospora africana 
Neurospora autosteira 
Neurospora bonaerensis 
Neurospora brevispora 
Neurospora caffra 
Neurospora calospora 
Neurospora cerealis 
Neurospora crassa 
Neurospora cratophora 
Neurospora dictyophora 
Neurospora discreta 
Neurospora dodgei 
Neurospora endodonta 
Neurospora erythraea 
Neurospora fallaciosa 
Neurospora foveaconica 
Neurospora galapagosensis 
Neurospora goundaensis 
Neurospora hapsidophora 
Neurospora heterospora 
Neurospora himalayensis 
Neurospora hippopotama 
Neurospora hispaniola 
Neurospora indica 
Neurospora intermedia 
Neurospora inversa 
Neurospora kobi 
Neurospora lineolata 
Neurospora longispora 
Neurospora macrospora 
Neurospora metzenbergii 
Neurospora micropertusa 
Neurospora mirabilis 
Neurospora multiforis 
Neurospora nigeriensis 
Neurospora novoguineensis 
Neurospora pannonica 
Neurospora perkinsii 
Neurospora pseudocalospora 
Neurospora pseudoreticulata 
Neurospora reticulata 
Neurospora retispora 
Neurospora saitoi 
Neurospora santi-florii 
Neurospora seminuda 
Neurospora sitophila 
Neurospora sphaerospora 
Neurospora stellata 
Neurospora sublineolata 
Neurospora terricola 
Neurospora tetrasperma 
Neurospora tetraspora 
Neurospora toroi 
Neurospora udagawae 
Neurospora uniporata 
Neurospora varians 

Neurospora xylopiae

As model organisms
Neurospora is widely used in genetics as a model organism (especially N. crassa) because it quickly reproduces, is easy to culture, and can survive on minimal media (inorganic salts, glucose, water and biotin in agar).

The first studies of sexual reproduction in Neurospora were made by B. O. Dodge. Neurospora was later used  by George Wells Beadle and Edward Lawrie Tatum in X-ray mutation experiments in order to discover mutants that would differ in nutritional requirements. The results of their experiments led them to the one gene-one enzyme hypothesis, in which they postulated that every enzyme was encoded with its own gene.

Research with Neurospora is reported semi-annually at the Neurospora Meeting at Asilomar, California, coordinated by the Fungal Genetics Stock Center. Mutant and wild-type strains of Neurospora are available from the FGSC. The FGSC also publishes the Fungal Genetics Reports.

Important people in Neurospora research:
Bernard Ogilvie Dodge  (1872–1960)
George Beadle (Nobel Prize in Physiology or Medicine, 1958)
Edward Tatum (Nobel Prize in Physiology or Medicine, 1958)
Esther Lederberg<ref>Hollaender, A., Sansome E. R., Zimmer, E., Demerec, M., April 1945, "Quantitative Irradiation Experiments with Neurospora crassa. II. Ultraviolet Irradiation", American Journal of Botany 32(4):226-235 Also: "Quantitative effects of radiation on mutation production in Neurospora crassa", Records of the Genetics Society of America, Number Thirteen, 1944</ref>
Norman Giles
David Perkins
Robert Metzenberg
Norman Horowitz
Herschel K. Mitchell
Mary B. Mitchell
Martha Merrow

Sexual reproduction

In the heterothallic species Neurospora crassa, interaction of haploid strains of opposite mating type is necessary for the occurrence of sexual reproduction and the production of ascospores by meiosis. Ascospores then restore haploid individuals of either mating type. The life cycle phase is thus predominantly haploid, however, upon mating, the nuclei do not immediately fuse: karyogamy is delayed until the very onset of meiosis. The resulting mycelium is called a heterokaryon, and is neither diploid, nor haploid. The genus Neurospora also includes homothallic species in which a single haploid individual carries both mating type loci and can undergo self-fertilization leading to meiosis and sexual reproduction.  Neurospora africana is an example of such a species. Additionally, some "Neurospora" species are said pseudohomothallic. They carry both mating types, but in separate nuclei in the same individual. Two haploid nuclei originating from the same meiosis are packaged into one ascospore. The individual is thus permanently heterokaryotic. Examples of this mating system include "Neurospora tetrasperma" and "Neurospora tetraspora".
Because heterothallic species necessarily undergo some degree of outcrossing they may benefit from a higher efficiency of selection because of higher effective recombination rates.  In contrast, pseudohomothallic and homothallic species do not outcross (or rarely) and do not experience these benefits: in homothallics a reduced efficiency  of negative selection has been shown. However, both hetero- and pseudohomothallic species benefit from the masking of deleterious recessive alleles in the heterokaryotic phase. In addition, all species derive the benefits of meiosis that include the removal of stress-induced DNA damages by homologous recombinational repair, and the formation of stress-resistant ascospores.

References

 External links 

  Fungal Genetics Stock Center
  Neurospora Meeting website
 Neurospora strains at the FGSC
 Neurospora genome projects
 Fungal Cell Biology Group at University of Edinburgh, UK. Website includes many movies and images of Neurospora.
  Fungal Genetics Reports
  Montenegro-Montero A. (2010) "The Almighty Fungi: The Revolutionary Neurospora crassa". A historical view of the many contributions of this organism to molecular biology.
  Neurospora crassa'' genome

Sordariales
Sordariomycetes genera
Taxa described in 1927